Kim Myong-gum  (born 4 November 1990) is a North Korean football defender who played for the North Korea women's national football team at the 2012 Summer Olympics.
At the club level, she played for Rimyongsu.

See also
 North Korea at the 2012 Summer Olympics

References

External links
 
 

1990 births
Living people
North Korean women's footballers
Place of birth missing (living people)
Footballers at the 2012 Summer Olympics
Olympic footballers of North Korea
Women's association football defenders
North Korea women's international footballers
2011 FIFA Women's World Cup players
21st-century North Korean women